Tayler Adams (born 24 November 1993) is a New Zealand rugby union player who plays as a halfback for the Toronto Arrows in Major League Rugby (MLR). He also represents Southland in the ITM Cup.

Career
He made his Southland debut in 2012, and his strong performances saw him named in the New Zealand national under-20 squad for the 2013 IRB Junior World Championship in France.

Between 2015 and 2018 he played in Australia, initially in the NRC, and in 2018 for the Melbourne Rebels in Super Rugby.

Career
At the age of just 18 years he was whisked into the Stags squad in 2012 after brothers Jimmy and Scott Cowan departed. He made his debut in an 84–nil loss to Canterbury in Christchurch, and went on to also start in Southland's remaining three games of the season. He moved to Australia in 2015, playing for Greater Sydney Rams and NSW Country Eagles in the NRC, and in 2018 for the Melbourne Rebels in Super Rugby. He returned to Southland following the 2018 Super Rugby season. In 2019 he joined the Toronto Arrows ahead of the 2020 Major League Rugby season.

References

Super Rugby statistics

External links
 Tayler Adams New Zealand U20s profile

New Zealand rugby union players
Living people
Southland rugby union players
Greater Sydney Rams players
Rugby union scrum-halves
1993 births
Rugby union players from Auckland
New Zealand expatriate rugby union players
Expatriate rugby union players in Australia
Melbourne Rebels players
New South Wales Country Eagles players
Expatriate rugby union players in Canada
Toronto Arrows players
Rugby union fly-halves